The Elk Hills are a low mountain range in the Transverse Ranges, in western Kern County, California.

They are near and east of the Elkhorn Hills in San Luis Obispo County, California

References 

Mountain ranges of Kern County, California
Transverse Ranges
Geography of the San Joaquin Valley
Hills of California
Mountain ranges of Southern California